The Najafgarh Metro Station is located on the Grey Line of the Delhi Metro. It was opened for public on 4 October 2019.

As part of Phase III of Delhi Metro, Najafgarh is metro station of the Grey Line.
As of July 2019, the construction work of the metro station was competed. Station was opened for public on 4 October 2019.
Najafgarh metro station is 288 meters long and is situated at a depth of 21 meters from the road level. The station is unique as it is only metro depot station to operate both Broad gauge and Standard gauge trains.

The existing Dwarka metro station is connected to the station through an 80-metre passage linking the old Dwarka metro station on Delhi Metro Blue Line to the new corridor. In order to accommodate the increased traffic of the area, an additional parking area also provides outside the metro station, which adhere to the multi-modal integration (MMI) model.

Station layout

Entry/Exit

See also
List of Delhi Metro stations
Transport in Delhi
Delhi Metro Rail Corporation
Delhi Suburban Railway

References

External links

 Delhi Metro Rail Corporation Ltd. (Official site) 
 Delhi Metro Annual Reports
 

Delhi Metro stations
Railway stations in South West Delhi district
Railway stations in India opened in 2019